Israel participated in and won the 1978 Eurovision Song Contest, held on 22 April 1978 in Paris, France. It marked Israel's first win at the contest and the first win for a country outside of continental Europe. The winning song was "A-Ba-Ni-Bi," composed (and conducted) by Nurit Hirsh, written by Ehud Manor, and performed by Izhar Cohen and the Alphabeta.

Before Eurovision

Israel Song Festival 1978 
1978 marked the first year Israel held a proper national final to select their Eurovision entry. Every entry between Israel's debut in 1973 and 1977 had been selected internally by the Israeli Broadcasting Authority (IBA), but following public consternation regarding Ilanit being chosen to represent Israel a second time, it was decided to reformat the annual Israel Song Festival to be a Eurovision selection show.

The Israeli national final was held on 11 February 1978 at the Jerusalem Theatre, hosted by Rivka Michaeli. Izhak Graziani served as the musical director. Twelve songs were in the running to represent Israel, and the performers included Gidi Gov (who had previously represented Israel in 1974 as a member of Kaveret) and Gali Atari (who would win the following year's selection, and indeed the actual contest, alongside Milk and Honey). Regional juries determined the winner, and at the end of the voting two songs were tied for first: Izhar Cohen and the Alphabeta's "A-Ba-Ni-Bi" and Chedva Amrani and Pilpel Lavan's "Belev echad." A re-count of the votes of the individual jury members broke the tie, and Cohen won the ticket to Paris.

At Eurovision
Hirsh and Manor had initially intended for "A-Ba-Ni-Bi" (with a chorus in the Bet language, the Hebrew equivalent of Pig Latin) to compete in the IBA Children's Song Festival, but the duo realized that the song had potential for Eurovision success, leading them to submit it to the IBA's Eurovision selection committee and eventually win the pre-selection. Hirsh conducted the orchestra (as she had also done for Israel's debut in 1973), making her one of only three female conductors in the contest's history (alongside Sweden's Monica Dominique in 1973 and Switzerland's Anita Kerr in 1985), as well as choreographed the group's dance moves. The up-tempo disco number became the favorite to win during rehearsals in Paris, with Hirsh suddenly inundated by international contracts. The night of the contest, Israel performed eighteenth, following Luxembourg (who had similarly gone for a disco group, Baccara) and preceding Austria. Israel wound up becoming runaway winners, scoring eight points or higher from eleven of the nineteen countries that had the ability to vote for them and six sets of the maximum twelve points (awarded by runner-up Belgium, Germany, Luxembourg, the Netherlands, Switzerland, and Turkey). Only one country (Sweden) failed to award the Israeli entry any points at all. They finished thirty-two points clear of Belgium and ensured that the contest would be held in Israel for the first time the following year. It was succeeded both as winner and as the Israeli representative by Milk and Honey with "Hallelujah." Israel reciprocated the Netherlands' 12 points, awarding Harmony and "'t Is OK" their sole twelve points. (Incidentally, Israel would not award the Dutch entry twelve points again for another forty-one years. The next time would be for Duncan Laurence's "Arcade," the winning entry of the 2019 contest held in Israel. By an amazing coincidence, these points were presented by Izhar Cohen).

Controversy with North African and Arab broadcasters 
The 1978 contest was transmitted by a number of broadcasters from countries that didn't acknowledge the State of Israel, including several Arab countries (such as Algeria, Jordan, and the United Arab Emirates). Many chose to cut to a commercial during the Israeli performance, and when it became clear Israel was going to win, they ended their broadcasts early. Jordanian TV closed the show by broadcasting photos of flowers, and later announced that runner-up Belgium were the winners instead. The story goes that since the Israeli broadcaster didn't buy enough airtime and those watching through neighboring broadcasters like Jordan never saw the end of the voting, many Israelis had no idea they had won until the following morning.

Voting

After Eurovision 
Izhar Cohen would go on to participate in the Israeli national final in 1982, 1985, 1987, and 1996. 1985 would prove successful, as he won the pre-selection and represented Israel with the song "Olé, Olé" and finished in fifth place.

References

1978
Countries in the Eurovision Song Contest 1978
Eurovision